Arthur Berger may refer to:

Arthur Asa Berger (born 1933), American social scientist
Arthur Berger (composer) (1912–2003), American composer

See also
Artur Berger (1892–1981), Austrian-Soviet film architect